The 2018 South Tyneside Council election took place on 3 May 2018 to elect members of South Tyneside Council in England, the same day as other local elections.

Candidates

Beacon & Bents ward

Bede ward

Biddick & All Saints ward

Boldon Colliery ward

Cleadon & East Boldon ward

Cleadon Park ward

Fellgate & Hedworth ward

Harton ward

Hebburn North ward

Hebburn South ward

Horsley Hill ward

Monkton ward

Primrose ward

Simonside & Rekendyke ward

West Park ward

Westoe ward

Whitburn & Marsden ward

Whiteleas ward

References

2018 English local elections
2018
21st century in Tyne and Wear